María de Bohórquez (1539 in Sevilla – 1559 in Sevilla), was a Spanish Protestant. She was executed for heresy by the Spanish Inquisition and was regarded a Protestant martyr. She became the subject of a novel, Cornelia Bororquia. Historia verdadera de la Judith by Luis Gutiérrez (1799).

References
 Juan Antonio Llorente: Historia crítica de la Inquisición española, Volumen 2, Gmünd 1820 1. Sección 21 parte principal, capítulos 14 y 15

16th-century Protestant martyrs
16th-century Spanish people
1539 births
1559 deaths
People executed for heresy
People executed by Spain by burning
Spanish evangelicals
People executed by the Spanish Inquisition